Below is a list of major power stations in Chongqing, China.

Non-renewable

Coal based

Natural gas based

Renewable

Hydroelectric – conventional

Hydroelectric – pumped storage

References

Power stations
Chongqing
Economy of Chongqing
Chongqing-related lists